This is a bibliography of works by Nathanael West

Novels

{| border="1" cellspacing="0"
|+
! Title !! Publisher !! Included in
|-
| The Dream Life of Balso Snell || Contact Editions, 1931 || The Complete works of Nathanael West,1957. Novels and other Writings, 1997
|-
| Miss Lonelyhearts || Liveright, 1933 || The Complete works of Nathanael West,1957. Novels and other Writings, 1997
|-
| A Cool Million || Covici Friede, 1934 || The Complete works of Nathanael West,1957. Novels and other Writings, 1997
|-
| The Day of the Locust || Random House, 1939 || The Complete works of Nathanael West,1957. Novels and other Writings, 1997
|-
|}

Short stories and novel excerpts
{| border="1" cellspacing="0"
|+
! Title !! First Published in !! Notes
|-
| "A Barefaced Lie" || Overland Monthly, 1929 || 
|-
| "Miss Lonelyhearts and the Lamb" || Contact, February 1932 || Excerpt from Miss Lonelyhearts
|-
| "Miss Lonelyhearts and the Dead Pan" || Contact, May 1932 || Excerpt from Miss Lonelyhearts
|-
| "Miss Lonelyhearts and the Clean Old Man" || Contact, May 1932 || Excerpt from Miss Lonelyhearts
|-
| "Miss Lonelyhearts in the Dismal Swamp"|| Contempo, July 1932 || Excerpt from Miss Lonelyhearts
|-
| "Miss Lonelyhearts on a Field Trip"|| Contact, October 1932 || Excerpt from Miss Lonelyhearts
|-
| "The Dear Public" || Americana, August 1933 || Excerpt from The Dream Life of Balso Snell
|-
| Unnamed excerpt || Americana, September 1933 || Excerpt from The Dream Life of Balso Snell
|-
| "Business Deal" || Americana, October 1933 || Collected in Novels and other Writings, 1997
|-
| "Bird and Bottle" || Pacific Weekly, November 1936 || Early section of The Day of the Locust; collected in Nathanael West: A Collection of Critical Essays 
|-
| "The Imposter" || The New Yorker, June 2, 1997 || Originally titled "The Fake", then retitled "L'Affaire Beano"; collected in Novels and other Writings, 1997 
|-
| "Western Union Boy" || – || Collected in Novels and other Writings, 1997 
|-
| "Mr. Potts of Pottstown" || – || Incomplete; collected in Novels and other Writings, 1997
|-
| "The Adventurer" || – || Incomplete; collected in Novels and other Writings, 1997
|-
| "Three Eskimos" || – || Used in The Day of the Locust;collected in Novels and other Writings, 1997 
|-
| "Tibetan Night" || – || Collected in Novels and other Writings, 1997
|-
| "The Sun, the Lady, and the Gas Station" || – ||
|-
|}

Plays
{| border="1" cellspacing="0"
|+
! Title !! Year !! in Collaboration with !! First performance !! Published in
|-
| Even Stephen || 1934 || S. J. Perelman || never performed || never published
|-
| Good Hunting || 1938 || Joseph Schrank ||  November 21, 1938, New York || Novels and other Writings, 1997
|-
|}

Poetry
{| border="1" cellspacing="0"
|+
! Title !! First published in !! Notes
|-
| "Rondeau" || The Brown Jug, 2, December 1922 || 
|-
| "Death" || Casements, May 1924 || Signed N. von Wallenstein-Weinstein
|-
| Christmass Poem || Contempo, February 1933 || Early version of "Burn the Cities"
|-
| "Burn the Cities" || – || Included in Novels and other Writings, 1997
|-
|}

Essays and reviews
{| border="1" cellspacing="0"
|+
! Title !! Publication details !! Included in:
|-
| Euripides—A Playwright || Casements, July 1923 || Novels and other Writings 
|-
| Book Marks for Today || World Telegram, October 1931 || –
|-
| Through the Hole in the Mundane Millstone || A leaflet by Contact Editions printed in 1931 to promote The Dream Life of Balso Snell || Novels and other Writings; Nathanael West: A Collection of Critical Essays
|- 
| Some Notes on Violence || Contact, October 1932 || Novels and other Writings; Nathanael West: A Collection of Critical Essays
|-
| Some Notes on Miss L. || Contempo, May 1933 || Novels and other Writings; Nathanael West: A Collection of Critical Essays
|-
| Soft Soap for the Barber || The New Republic, November 1934 || Novels and other Writings 
|-
|}

Film writing

(in collaboration with others, unless noted otherwise)
{| border="1" cellspacing="0"
|+
! Title !! year !! Studio !! Format !! Notes
|-
| Beauty Parlor || Written 1933 || Columbia || Screenplay || Never produced
|-
| Return to the Soil || Written 1933 || Columbia || Screenplay || Never produced
|-
| Osceola || Written 1935 || – || Treatment || Never produced
|-
| Ticket to Paradise || 1936 || Republic Productions || Treatment and screenplay ||
|-
| Follow Your Heart || 1936 || Republic Productions || Screenplay ||
|-
| The President's Mystery || 1936 || Republic Productions || Screenplay ||
|-
| Rhythm in the Clouds || 1937 || Republic Productions || Screenplay ||
|-
| It Could Happen to You || 1937 || Republic Productions || Screenplay ||
|-
| Jim Hanvey – Detective || 1937 || Republic Productions || Screenplay || Uncredited
|-
| Born to Be Wild || 1938 || Republic Productions || Screenplay ||
|-
| Gangs of New York || 1938 || Republic Productions || Screenplay || Uncredited
|-
| Ladies in Distress || 1938 || Republic Productions || Screenplay || Uncredited
|-
| Bachelor Girl || written 1937 || Republic Productions || Screenplay || Never produced
|-
| Orphans of the Street || 1938 || Republic Productions || Treatment and screenplay || Uncredited
|-
| Stormy Weather || Written 1937-8 || Republic Productions || Treatment and partial screenplay || Never Produced
|-
| The Squealer || 1938 || Columbia || Screenplay || Unfinished
|-
| Flight South || Written 1938 || MGM || Treatment || Never produced
|-
| The Spirit of Culver || 1939 || Universal Studios || Screenplay ||
|-
| Five Came Back || 1939 || RKO Pictures || Screenplay ||
|-
| I Stole a Million || 1939 || Universal Studios || Screenplay || Solo screenwriting credit
|-
| The Victoria Docks at Eight || Written 1939 || Universal Studios || Screenplay || Never filmed
|-
| Stranger on the Third Floor || 1940 || RKO Pictures || Screenplay || Uncredited 
|-
| Men Against the Sky || 1940 || RKO Pictures || Screenplay || Solo screenwriting credit
|-
| Let's Make Music || 1941 || RKO Pictures || Screenplay || Solo screenwriting credit
|-
| Before the Fact || Written 1939 || RKO Pictures || Screenplay || Never filmed
|-
| A Cool Million || Written 1940 || Columbia || Screen story || Never produced
|-
| Bird in Hand || Written 1940 || RKO Pictures || Treatment ||
|-
| Amateur Angel || Written 1940 || Columbia || Screenplay || worked on until his death
|}

Collections
{| border="1" cellspacing="0"
|+ 
! Title !! Year !! Publisher !! Notes
|-
| The Complete Works of Nathanael West || 1957 || Farrar Straus and Company || Reprinted in 1963, 1975; includes the four novels
|-
| A Cool Million & The Dream Life of Balso Snell || 1961 || Farrar Straus and Company ||
|-
| Miss Lonelyhearts & The Day of the Locust || 1969 || New Directions ||
|-
| Nathanael West: A Collection of Critical Essays || 1971 || Prentice Hall (20th century Views series) || Includes three essays and one story by West in addition to critical writings about him.
|-
| Novels and other Writings || 1997 || Library of America || Includes novels, short stories, essays, and a selection of letters
|-
|}

Books about Nathanael West
{| border="1" cellspacing="0"
|+
! Title 
!
!
!
! !! Writer !! Year !! Genre
|-
| Nathanael West 
|
|
|
| || Stanley Edgar Hyman || 1962 || Critical Study
|-
| Nathanael West, the Ironic Prophet 
|
|
|
| || Victor Comerchero || 1964 || Critical Study
|-
| The Fiction of Nathanael West, No Redeemer, No Promised land 
|
|
|
| ||Randall Reid || 1967 || Critical Study
|-
| Nathanael West: The Art of His Life 
|
|
|
| ||Jay Martin || 1971 || Biography
|-
| Nathanael West: An Interpretative Study 
|
|
|
| ||James F. Light || 1971 || Critical Study
|-
| Nathanael West 
|
|
|
| || Robert Emmet Long || 1985 || Critical Study
|-
| Lonelyhearts: The Screwball World of Nathanael West and Eileen McKenney 
|
|
|
| ||Marion Meade || 2010 || Biography of West and his wife
|-
|}

Adaptations of Nathanael West's work
{| border="1" cellspacing="0"
|+
! Title !! Adaptation of !! Year !! Format
|-
| Advice to the Lovelorn || Miss Lonelyhearts || 1933 || Feature Film
|-
| I'll Tell the World || Miss Lonelyhearts || 1945 || Feature Film
|-
| Miss Lonelyhearts || Miss Lonelyhearts || 1957 || Play
|-
| Lonelyhearts || Miss Lonelyhearts || 1958 || Feature Film
|-
| Miss Lonelyhearts || Miss Lonelyhearts || 1983 || TV Film
|-
| The Day of the Locust || The Day of the Locust || 1975 || Feature Film
|-
| Miss Lonelyhearts || Miss Lonelyhearts || 2006 || Opera
|-
|}

References

 Bercovitch, Sacvan, ed. Nathanael West, Novels and Other Writings (Library of America, 1997) 
 Martin, Jay, Nathanael West: The Art of His Life'' (New York: Farrar, Straus & Giroux, 1970)

Bibliographies by writer
Bibliographies of American writers